Sir Auguste-Réal Angers  (4 October 1837 – 14 April 1919) was a Canadian judge and parliamentarian, holding seats both as a member of the House of Commons of Canada, and as a Senator. He was born in 1837 probably in Quebec City and died in Westmount, Quebec, in 1919.

He served in the cabinets of Sir John Sparrow David Thompson and Sir Mackenzie Bowell as Minister of Agriculture and as President of the Privy Council under Sir Charles Tupper. He also served as a Member of the Legislative Assembly of Quebec after being elected in Montmorency in 1874 as a Conservative.

He was knighted in the 1913 New Year Honours.

After his death in 1919, he was entombed at the Notre Dame des Neiges Cemetery in Montreal.

Early life
There is an element of mystery around Auguste's birth. Historians generally agree he was born on 4 October 1837 but no substantial birth certificate has ever been found. The 1901 census lists his birth as 4 October.

Angers studied at the Séminaire de Nicolet between 1849 and 1856. He eventually went on to study law at the Université de Laval. He then went on to join a prospering law firm in Quebec City. After building a strong background for politics, he went on to easily won a provincial by-election in Montmorency for the Conservatives.

Delve into Politics
After being re-elected to his seat in Montmorency, in 1875 he was appointed as Government leader in the Legislative Assembly and Attorney General in 1876. Since the Premier of Quebec at the time Charles Boucher de Boucherville was sitting in the Legislative Council, the appointed Upper Chamber of the Province, Angers acted as the voice to the government in the Legislative Assembly helping pass key legislation. He continued to act in this role for multiple years.

In 1879, Angers lost his seat by 14 votes in a general election. Afterwards, he ran for Federal Parliament in a by-election winning the Montmorency seat. Shortly afterwards he was appointed as puisne judge of the Superior Court for Montmagny district.

He settled down in a town on the St. Lawrence River.

In 1887 Angers accepted an appointment making him Lieutenant Governor of the Province of Quebec.

In December 1892 he accepted an appointment as a Senator and was given an agriculture portfolio in John Sparrow David Thompson's Ministry. He continued in this capacity until 1895 where he resigned and briefly took up the post of President of the Privy Council before retiring from politics.

Later life
Angers moved to Montreal where he returned to practicing law and in 1911 he was appointed as legal counsel to the Montreal Harbour Commission.

Archives 
There are Auguste-Réal Angers fonds at Library and Archives Canada and Bibliothèque et Archives nationales du Québec.

References

External links
 
 
 

1837 births
1919 deaths
Lawyers in Quebec
Canadian senators from Quebec
Conservative Party of Canada (1867–1942) MPs
Conservative Party of Canada (1867–1942) senators
Canadian Knights Bachelor
Members of the House of Commons of Canada from Quebec
Members of the King's Privy Council for Canada
Conservative Party of Quebec MNAs
Lieutenant Governors of Quebec
Université Laval alumni
Burials at Notre Dame des Neiges Cemetery